Steve Robin is an American television director and producer best known for his work with television producer David E. Kelley.

As a producer, associate producer and supervising producer his credits include Picket Fences, Ally McBeal, girls club, The Brotherhood of Poland, New Hampshire and Boston Legal, making his directorial debut on the latter series.

His other directing credits include Raising the Bar, Grey's Anatomy, Bones, Castle, Harry's Law, Franklin & Bash, Rizzoli & Isles and The Closer.

In 1999, Robin won a Primetime Emmy Award for his work on Ally McBeal as a part of the producing team.

Filmography

References

External links

American television directors
American television producers
Primetime Emmy Award winners
Living people
Place of birth missing (living people)
Year of birth missing (living people)